James Edward Preston Muddock also known as "Joyce Emmerson Preston Muddock" and "Dick Donovan" (28 May 1843 – 23 January 1934), was a prolific British journalist and author of mystery and horror fiction. For a time his detective stories were as popular as those of Arthur Conan Doyle. Between 1889 and 1922 he published nearly 300 detective and mystery stories.

Life
Muddock was the third of four children, born near Southampton, England, to sea captain James Muddock and Elizabeth Preston. At 14 he travelled to India. During his journalistic career he travelled to China, the United States, and Australia.  Muddock's father had made poor investments and was compelled to work overseas, so Muddock rarely saw his father in his early years.  By 1870 Muddock had started publishing serial stories in English newspapers.

Family
Muddock had been married three times, in 1861, in 1871 and in 1880, with ten children who survived infancy.

One of his daughters was the figure skater Dorothy Greenhough-Smith. Another daughter, Evangeline Hope Muddock (1883-1953), changed her name to Eva Mudocci. She was a violinist, and became mistress and friend to Expressionist painter Edvard Munch. One of his grandsons was Charles le Gai Eaton.  He had three sons who fell in World War I.  Replying to a letter of condolence from a lady (a certain "Collette") on Christmas Eve, 1917 - writing from his home near Putney Common - he also recounted how his last son had fallen just "seven miles from Jerusalem".  Despite this most tragic personal loss, Muddock still managed to see his sons as English "gentlemen" whose deaths were part of the great sacrifice the nation was making.

Muddock had few publications after about 1920 and died in 1934, relying on his daughters to support him at the end of his life.

Works
Most of Muddock's stories featured his continuing character Dick Donovan, the Glasgow Detective, named for one of the 18th Century Bow Street Runners.  The character was so popular that later stories were published under this pen name. Muddock also wrote true crime stories, horror, and 37 novels, most as "Dick Donovan". His non-fiction included four history books, seven guidebooks for areas in the Alps and his autobiography. His stories were used by The Strand Magazine in months when there were no Sherlock Holmes stories available.

Muddock's detective stories differ from the psychological investigation of character in modern detective fiction, and they are described as having sensational plots but little character development. Atmospheric details of the setting were minimal, perhaps to ensure acceptance in both the U.K. and the U. S. markets. Deduction and logical thought in the "Donovan" stories are of significantly less importance than in the nearly contemporary Sherlock Holmes stories.

Flin Flon, Manitoba
The town of Flin Flon takes its name from the lead character in a 1905 paperback novel by Muddock. In The Sunless City, Josiah Flintabbatey Flonatin pilots a submarine through a bottomless lake. Upon passing through a hole lined with gold, he finds a strange underground world. A prospector Thomas Creighton found the book in the wilderness. When he discovered a rich vein of almost pure copper, by a deep lake, it reminded him of the book. So he called it Flin Flon's mine, shortening the name.

References

 Who Was Dick Donovan?  Essay by Bruce Durie, retrieved Sept. 8, 2005

External links
 List of Muddock fiction publications under the pen name Dick Donovan
 Online version of The Sunless City
His short ghost story the 'Corpse Light' that is in the public domain
 

1843 births
1934 deaths
British writers